During the 2002–03 English football season, Nottingham Forest competed in the Football League First Division.

Season summary
Nottingham Forest rebounded from the previous season's disappointment to finish 6th in the First Division, setting up a play-off  with third-placed Sheffield United. Forest were beaten 5–4 on aggregate over two epic semi-final legs, consigning the club to another season in English football's second tier.

Final league table

First-team squad
Squad at end of season

Left club during season

Appearances

Playoff stats are included under Division 1.

 
 

|-
|}

Results

Football League First Division

Play Offs

FA Cup

League Cup

References

Nottingham Forest F.C. seasons
Nottingham Forest